The Ui LRT, referred to as the Ui-Sinseol LRT or Ui-Sinseol Line in Korean, is a light metro which is part of Seoul Metropolitan Subway. It is a fully underground  Light Rapid Transit line from Ui-dong to Sinseol-dong in northern Seoul which opened on September 2, 2017. The line, which is expected to carry 110,000 passengers a day, has 13 stations. It connects to Line 4 at Sungshin Women's University, Line 6 at Bomun and Lines 1 & 2 at Sinseol-dong. The last (northernmost) station is in Ui-dong, hence the name of the line. In 2019, the line carried 27 million passengers or about 75,000 people per day.  

The line uses a dedicated fleet of 18 trains built by Rotem, a member of Hyundai Motor Group. Each train consists of single 2-section unit with a Jacobs bogie in the center, similar to many street running high floor light rail vehicles such as the light rail rolling stock of Los Angeles, although it is powered by a bottom contact third rail similar to the Docklands Light Railway rolling stock in London. However, they only run as singles instead of the 2- and 3-car trains used on the DLR.

Stations 

All stations are located in Seoul.

Notes

References

External links 
Ui LRT's Official Website (Korean language)
Future Rail Database (Korean language)

Light rail in South Korea
750 V DC railway electrification